Nirenstein (also spelled Nierenstein or the Polish version Nirensztajn) is a Yiddish and German-language surname. The word, Niere and Stein, literally translates as "kidney stone"

Notable people with this surname include:
Fiamma Nirenstein (born 1945), Italian-Israeli politician
Otto Kallir (born Otto Nirenstein; 1894-1978), Austrian-American artist
Maximilian Nierenstein (1877-1946), German professor
Pola Nirensztajn (1910-1992), Polish dancer

Yiddish-language surnames
German-language surnames
Polish-language surnames